Ukrainian avant-garde is a term widely used to refer the most innovative metamorphosises in Ukrainian art from the end of 1890s to the middle of the 1930s along with associated artists. Broadly speaking, it is Ukrainian art synchronized with the international avant-garde in sculpture, painting, literature, cinema, theater, stage design, graphics, music, architecture. Some well-known Ukrainian avant-garde artists  include: Kazimir Malevich, Alexander Archipenko, Vladimir Tatlin, Sonia Delaunay, Vasyl Yermylov, Alexander Bogomazov, Aleksandra Ekster, David Burliuk, Vadym Meller, and Anatol Petrytsky. All were closely connected to the Ukrainian cities of Kyiv, Kharkiv, Lviv, and Odesa by birth, education, language, national traditions or identity.
The first formal artistic group to call itself "Avangarde" (Avant-garde)  which was founded in Kharkiv in 1925. The term, "Ukrainian Avant-Garde", concerning painting and sculpture during Soviet censorship, was used during discussion at Tatlin's dream exhibition. Curated by Parisian art historian Andréi Nakov, in London, 1973, the exhibition showcased works of Ukrainian artists Vasyl Yermylov and Alexander Bogomazov. 
The first international avant-garde exhibitions in Ukraine, which included French, Italian, Ukrainian and Russian artists, were presented in Odesa and Kyiv at the Izdebsky Salon;  the pieces were later exhibited in St. Petersburg and Riga.  The cover of "Izdebsky Salon 2" (1910–11) 
contained abstract work by Wassily Kandinsky.

Timeline 

 1908: Exhibition "Zveno" in Kyiv; works by Alexandra Exter, David Burliuk, Vladimir Burliuk, Yevgeny Agafonov, and Volodymyr Denisov.
 1909: "Blue Lily" at Kharkiv; works by Eugene Agafonov, Maria Sinyakova, and Vasyl Yermilov.
 1910: Exhibition "Salon Izdebsky 2" at Odesa and Kyiv; works by Alexandra Exter, David and Vladimir Burliuk, and Wassily Kandinsky, alongside pieces by Pierre Bonnard, Georges Braque, Maurice de Vlaminck, Maurice Denis, Henri Matisse, Henri Rousseau, and Paul Signac.
 1910: "Hylaea", a Ukrainian-Russian association of Futurist poets, is founded in Chorniaka, Kahovsky region, South of Ukraine. Members include David and Vladimir Burliuk, V. Kamensky, Aleksei Kruchyonykh, Benedikt Livshits, Vladimir Mayakovsky, Velimir Khlebnikov, and others.
 1913: Mykhaylo Semenko in Kyiv founds the Ukrainian futurist group "Quero".
 1914: Aleksandra Ekster – together with her fellow-Ukrainians Archipenko, Vladimir Baranov-Rossiné, Kazimir Malevich , Vadym Meller and the Burliuk brothers, exhibit at the Société des Artistes Indépendants in Paris and, alongside Archipenko, take part in the Esposizione Libera Futurista Internazionale in Rome.
 1914: Aleksandra Ekster and Alexander Bogomazov found the group of Cubo-Futurists artists named "Koltso" in Kyiv.
 1917: Artistic group "Union of Seven" is founded in Kharkiv; members included Boris Kosarev, Georgy Tsapok, Volodymyr Bobrytsky, and Nikolai Kalmykov.
 1924: Kyiv Art Institute (KHI); members included Alexander Bogomazov, Vadym Meller, Victor Palmov, Kazimir Malevich, and Volodymyr Tatlin.
 1925: Artistic association and magazine "Avangarde" at Kharkiv, founded by Valerian Polishchuk and Vasyl Yermilov.
 1925: Association of Revolutionary Art of Ukraine (ARMU) founded in Kyiv; members include Mykhailo Boychuk, Alexander Bogomazov, Victor Palmov, Vasyl Yermilov and Vadym Meller.
 1927: The Union of Modern Artists of Ukraine (OSMU) is founded in Kyiv; Victor Palmov, Anatol Petrytsky, and Pavel Golubyitnikov are involved.
 1927: Artistic association and the magazine "New Generation" is founded in Kharkiv by M. Semenko, Nina Genke-Meller, Vadym Meller, Anatol Petrytsky, and Geo Shkarupii.

People involved

Cinema 

Alexander Dovzhenko

Painters 

Yevgeny Agafonov
Alexander Bogomazov
Aleksandra Ekster
Mykhailo Boychuk
Vladimir Burliuk 
David Burliuk
Mykola Hlushchenko
Sonia Delaunay
Oleksandr Hnylytskyi 
Kazimir Malevich
Abraham A. Manievich
Vadym Meller
Victor Palmov
Oksana Pavlenko
Kostiantyn Piskorskyi
Vasily Sedlyar
Manuil Shechtman
Maria Sinyakova
Vladimir Tatlin
Vasyl Yermylov

Sculptors 

Alexander Archipenko
Ivan Kavaleridze
Petro Mitkovicer

Theatre directors 

Boris Balaban
Les Kurbas
Faust Lopatynsky
Volodymyr Sklyarenko
Mark Tereshchenko
Januariy Bortnik

Stage Designers 

Aleksandra Ekster
Vadym Meller
Anatol Petrytsky
Alexander Khvostenko-Khvostov
Mykhailo Andriienko-Nechytailo

Writers 

Mykola Bazhan
Myroslav Irchan
Mykola Khvylovy
Valerian Polishchuk
Mykhaylo Semenko
Geo Shkurupiy
Oleksa Slisarenko
Maik Yohansen
Mykhailo Yaloviy
Yuriy Yanovsky

Architects 
Pavlo Alyoshin
Valerian Rykov

Composers 
Borys Lyatoshynsky
Zinoviy Lysko
Stefania Turkewich

References

External links 
 Ukrainian avant-garde http://avantgarde.org.ua/en.php
 Library Of Ukrainian Art http://en.uartlib.org/ukrainian-avant-garde/
 Kyiv to Paris: Ukrainian Art in the European Avant-Garde, 1905-1930 http://www.zoryafineart.com/publications/view/11/app/webroot/Zorya_Inc.pdf
 Staging the Ukrainian Avant-Garde of the 1910s and 1920s https://www.studiointernational.com/index.php/staging-the-ukrainian-avant-garde-1910s-1920s-theatre-design-new-york
 UKRAINIAN AVANT-GARDE ARTISTS OF THE EARLY 20TH CENTURY http://www.encyclopediaofukraine.com/Art.asp#Topic_14
 Online Museum of Ukrainian Avant-Garde Embroidery http://www.uaheritage.com/en/dna-avant-garde-embroidery

Further reading 
 Birnie Danzker J.-A. Die Avantgarde und die Ukraine / Avantgarde and Ukraine / J.-A. Birnie Danzker, I. Jasenjawsky, J. Kiblitsky. – Munhen : Klinhardt & Biermann, 1993. – P. 13-40.
 Dmytro Gorbachev, Ukrainian avant-garde. In the European artistic revolution of the twentieth century, Pamyatki Ukrainy. - 1991. - No. 4. - P. 22-29.
 Endre Bojtar, Die Avantgarde in der ukrainischen Lyrik der zwanziger Jahre. In: M. Semenko: Ausgewahlte Werke. Würzburg, 1983. 218-233.
 Jean-Claude Marcadé, Raum, Farbe, Hyperbolismus : Besonderheiten der Ukrainischen Avantgardekunst / Jean-Claude Marcadé, J.-A. Birnie Danzker, I. Jasenjawsky, J. Kiblitsky // Avantgarde and Ukraine. – Munhen : Klinhardt & Biermann, 1993. – P. 41-51.
 John E. Bowlt, Performing Arts Journal, Vol. 1, No. 3 (Winter, 1977), pp. 62–84.
 Mahdalyna Laslo-Kutsiuk, Shukannia formy: narysy z ukrainskoi literatury XX stolittia. Bucharest: Kriterion, 1980. 327 p.
 Myroslav Shkandrij THE'LITERARY DISCUSSION'IN SOVIET UKRAINE, 1925-1928 (dissertation), University of Toronto, 1982.
 Myroslav Shkandrij. The Phenomenon of the Ukrainian Avant-Garde 1910-1935. Winnipeg Art Gallery: , 2001. 
 Myroslav Shkandrij. Avant-Garde Art in Ukraine, 1910–1930: Contested Memory, 2019 
 Myroslava Mudrak, NOVA GENERATSIIA"(1927-1930) AND THE ARTISTIC AVANT-GARDE IN THE UKRAINE (dissertation), University of Texas at Austin, 1980.
 Myroslava Mudrak, The New Generation and Artistic Modernism in the Ukraine, Umi Research Press, USA, 1986, pp 282, 
 Myroslava Mudrak, The painted surface in the Ukrainian Avant-garde : from facture to construction, Pantheon, 1987.
 Myroslava Mudrak, The New Generation and Artistic Modernism in the Ukraine (review by: Leon Tsao) Leonardo Vol. 21, No. 3 (1988), pp. 332–333.
 Myroslava Mudrak, The Ukrainian Studio of Plastic Arts in Prague and the Art of Jan Kulec, Art Journal Vol. 49, No. 1, (Spring, 1990), pp. 36–43.
 Natalia Aseeva, Ukrainian-French relations 20-30's. XX century. N.Aseyeva. - K.: Naukova dumka, 1984. 226 pp.
 Olena Golub,  Everything was beginning from aquarelle. Day, 2010, (September 16.).
 P Kirchner, I Kongreß der Internationalen Assoziation der Ukrainisten, Zeitschrift für Slawistik, 1991.
 Ukrajinska avangarda 1910-1930: Muzej suvremene umjetnosti, Zagreb, 16. 12. 1990.-24. 
 Valentina Markade, Ukrainian art of the twentieth century and Western Europe, V. Markage, Vsesvit. - 1990. - No. 7. - P. 169-180.
 Valentina Markage, Art D`ukrain / V. Markade. – Paris : L`age D`Homme, 1990. – 349 p.
 Virlana Tkacz, Les Kurbas and the Creation of a Ukrainian Avant-garde Theatre: The Early Years, Columbia University, 1983 . 

 
Avant-garde
Avant-garde art
Modern history of Ukraine